The 2018 West Virginia Senate elections were held on November 6, 2018, as part of the biennial United States elections. Seventeen of West Virginia's 34 state senators were up for election. West Virginia Senate districts each have two elected representatives. State senators serve staggered four-year terms in West Virginia, with one senator from each district up in even-numbered years corresponding to presidential election years (most recently held in 2016), and the other up in even-numbered years corresponding to presidential midterm years.

Primary elections in the state were held on May 8. After the previous 2016 state elections, Republicans held a majority in the Senate, holding 22 seats to the Democrats' 12. The Republican Party had long been the minority party in the Mountain State, but the decline of the strength of coal worker unions, the Democratic Party's increasing focus on environmentalism, the unpopularity of President Barack Obama, and the increasing social conservatism of the Republican Party have helped the GOP solidify power in the state rapidly since 2000.

Despite the high popularity of President Donald Trump within the state and his 42-point margin of victory there in 2016, the Democrats gained two seats in the West Virginia Senate in 2018. This can be attributed to the competitive U.S. Senate race at the top of the ticket (which was won by incumbent Democrat Joe Manchin), the increasing insulation of the West Virginia Democratic Party from the national Democratic Party (particularly on social issues, such as abortion), and a strong year for the Democratic Party nationally, in which they gained control of the U.S. House of Representatives.

Following the state's 2018 Senate elections, Republicans maintained control of the Senate with 20 seats to the Democrats' 14.

Retirements
No incumbents retired in 2018. All 17 incumbent Senators ran for re-election.

Incumbents defeated

In primary elections
Three incumbents were defeated in the May primaries, one more than were defeated in the 2016 primaries.

Republicans
District 4: Mark Drennan lost renomination to Eric Tarr.
District 9: Lynne Arvon lost renomination to Rollan Roberts.
District 11: Robert Karnes lost renomination to Bill Hamilton.

In the general election

Republicans
District 1: Ryan Ferns lost to William J. Ihlenfeld.
District 8: Ed Gaunch lost to Richard Lindsay.

Results summary

All results are certified by the Secretary of State of West Virginia.

Senate President Election 
On January 9, 2019, the West Virginia Senate convened to elect a President for the 84th West Virginia Legislature. The incumbent President, Mitch Carmichael, was nominated by Randy Smith. The nomination was then seconded by Charles Trump. Roman Prezioso received a nomination from Bob Beach, which was seconded by Ron Stollings. In a 19 to 14 vote, Mitch Carmichael was re-elected President of the Senate, having received the support of the eighteen other Republicans present, as well as Senator Prezioso. Mike Maroney, a Republican, was the sole absent member.

Close races

Summary of results by State Senate District

Detailed results by State Senate District

All results are certified by the Secretary of State of West Virginia.

District 1

Republican primary

Democratic primary

General election

District 2

Republican primary

Democratic primary

General election

District 3

Republican primary

Democratic primary

General Election

District 4

Republican primary

Democratic primary

General election

District 5

Republican primary

Democratic primary

General election

District 6

Republican primary

Democratic primary

General election

District 7

Republican primary

Democratic primary

General election

District 8

Republican primary

Democratic primary

General election

District 9

Republican primary

Democratic primary

General election

District 10

Republican primary

Democratic primary

General election

District 11

Republican primary

Democratic primary

General election

District 12

Republican primary

Democratic primary

General election

District 13

Republican primary

Democratic primary

General election

District 14

Republican primary

Democratic primary

General election

District 15

Republican primary

General election

District 16

Republican primary

Democratic primary

General election

District 17

Republican primary

Democratic primary

General election

References

Senate 2018
Election 2018
West Virginia Senate
West Virginia Senate elections